Fruits amers (Bitter Fruit), or in Spanish release Soledad, is a 1967 film directed by Jacqueline Audry and starring Emmanuelle Riva, Laurent Terzieff, and Beba Lončar.

References

1967 films
French drama films
Films set in South America
1960s French-language films
1960s French films